The Texas Rangers 1981 season involved the Rangers finishing 2nd in the American League West with a record of 57 wins and 48 losses. The season was suspended for 50 days due to the infamous 1981 players strike and the league chose as its playoff teams, the division winners from the first and second halves of the season, respectively.

Offseason 
 December 12, 1980: Richie Zisk, Rick Auerbach, Ken Clay, Jerry Don Gleaton, Brian Allard, and Steve Finch (minors) were traded by the Rangers to the Seattle Mariners for Willie Horton, Larry Cox, Rick Honeycutt, Mario Mendoza, and Leon Roberts.
 December 18, 1980: Bob Jones was signed as a free agent by the Rangers.

Regular season

Season standings

Record vs. opponents

Notable transactions 
 April 1, 1981: Willie Horton was released by the Rangers.
 June 8, 1981: Ron Darling was drafted by the Rangers in the 1st round (9th pick) of the 1981 Major League Baseball Draft.

Roster

Player stats

Batting

Starters by position 
Note: Pos = Position; G = Games played; AB = At bats; H = Hits; Avg. = Batting average; HR = Home runs; RBI = Runs batted in

Other batters 
Note: G = Games played; AB = At bats; H = Hits; Avg. = Batting average; HR = Home runs; RBI = Runs batted in

Pitching

Starting pitchers 
Note: G = Games pitched; IP = Innings pitched; W = Wins; L = Losses; ERA = Earned run average; SO = Strikeouts

Other pitchers 
Note: G = Games pitched; IP = Innings pitched; W = Wins; L = Losses; ERA = Earned run average; SO = Strikeouts

Relief pitchers 
Note: G = Games pitched; W = Wins; L = Losses; SV = Saves; ERA = Earned run average; SO = Strikeouts

Awards and honors 
Buddy Bell, 3B, Gold Glove 1981
Al Oliver, Silver Slugger Award, 1981
Jim Sundberg, C, Gold Glove, 1981

All-Star Game

Farm system

Notes

References 
1981 Texas Rangers team page at Baseball Reference
1981 Texas Rangers team page at www.baseball-almanac.com

Texas Rangers seasons
Texas Rangers season
Texas Rang